Matiur Rahman (20 September 1933 - 1 March 2003) Bangladeshi Politician and organizer of the Liberation War who was a Member of Parliament and Minister. He was a Member of Parliament for the then Rangpur-10 constituency. He was the Minister of Housing in the second cabinet of Sheikh Mujibur Rahman and the Minister of Local Government, Rural Development and Cooperatives in the third cabinet.

Early life 
Rahman was born in Rasulpur village of Kumedpur in Pirganj of Rangpur district. After passing BA, he started business in Dhaka. When Sheikh Mujibur Rahman was imprisoned in the Agartala case in 1968, he married Sheikh Hasina and Wazed Miah as a lawyer father.

Career 
Rahman was the organizer of the war of liberation in 1971. He played an active role in all the political activities of the time including the 6-point movement, language movement and participation in the war of independence of Bangladesh. During the war of liberation he served as the chairman of nine people under sector number six. He was elected a member of the National Assembly in the 1970 general election of Pakistan. He was elected to parliament from Rangpur-11 as an Awami League candidate in 1973. He was the Minister of Housing in the second cabinet of Sheikh Mujibur Rahman and the Minister of Local Government, Rural Development and Cooperatives in the third cabinet.

He was the President of the Dhaka Chamber of Commerce and Industry (1979-1982).

References 

1933 births
2003 deaths
Awami League politicians
Local Government, Rural Development and Co-operatives ministers
1st Jatiya Sangsad members
Housing and Public Works ministers of Bangladesh
Government ministers of Bangladesh
People of the Bangladesh Liberation War